The WWF International Heavyweight Championship is a former championship recognized by the Capitol Wrestling Corporation, the World Wrestling Federation, New Japan Pro-Wrestling, and the Universal Wrestling Federation.

History
The title existed from 1959 through 1963 and again from 1982 through 1985.

Reigns

See also
WCW International World Heavyweight Championship

References

External links
WWF International Heavyweight Title History

WWE championships
New Japan Pro-Wrestling championships
International professional wrestling championships
International